We Became Snakes is Saccharine Trust's second album, released in 1986 through SST. It would be their last studio effort until the release of The Great One Is Dead fifteen years later.

Track listing

Personnel 

Saccharine Trust
Joe Baiza – guitar, vocals on "Longing for Ether"
Jack Brewer – vocals, acoustic guitar on "Belonging to October"
Tony Cicero – drums
Bob Fitzer – bass guitar
Steve Moss – tenor saxophone, harmonica on "Belonging to October"

Additional musicians and production
Louise Bialik – accordion on "Belonging to October"
Gary Jacobelly – vocals on "Longing for Ether"
Ethan James – engineering
Lame Dude – twelve-string acoustic guitar on "Belonging to October"
Mike Watt – production
Paul Roessler – piano on "The Need"

References

External links 
 

1986 albums
SST Records albums
Saccharine Trust albums